George Putnam may refer to:

George Putnam (editor) (1872–1961), Oregon newspaper publisher and editor of the Statesman Journal
George Putnam (newsman) (1914–2008), Los Angeles, California, television newsman
George D. Putnam (born 1948), screenwriter, Unlawful Entry
George Palmer Putnam (1814–1872), founder of the publishing firm that became G. P. Putnam's Sons
George Haven Putnam (1844–1930), American soldier, publisher, author, son of George Palmer Putnam
George Herbert Putnam (1861–1955), lawyer, publisher, librarian of Library of Congress, son of George Palmer Putnam
George P. Putnam (1887–1950), publisher, author, explorer, grandson of George Palmer Putnam, husband of Amelia Earhart
George Washington Putnam (1826–1899), American soldier and politician
George Putnam (businessman), founder of Putnam Investments
George Putnam III, his grandson, editor and founder of The Turnaround Letter

See also
G. P. Putnam's Sons, a United States book publisher